Notropis is a genus of freshwater fish in the family Cyprinidae. They are known commonly as eastern shiners. They are native to North America, and are the continent's second largest genus.

A 1997 phylogenetic analysis placed the genus in a clade with Campostoma, Cyprinella,  Phenacobius, Platygobio and Rhinichthys. The systematics of the genus is still unclear. It has not been confirmed to be monophyletic. While it has been divided into several subgenera and species groups, the relationships between the taxa are not yet understood.

Characteristics 
Members of the genus Notropis have eight dorsal rays and usually have no barbel (with the exception of Redeye chub). Scales for most species are not usually that much taller than they are wide. Their scales are usually not diamond shaped.

Their intestines are short and usually have one loop at the front.

Species
There are currently 88 recognized species in this genus:

 Notropis aguirrepequenoi Contreras-Balderas & Rivera-Tiellery, 1973 (Soto la Marina shiner)
 Notropis albizonatus Warren & Burr, 1994 (Palezone shiner)
 Notropis alborus C. L. Hubbs & Raney, 1947 (Whitemouth shiner)
 Notropis altipinnis (Cope, 1870) (Highfin shiner)
 Notropis amabilis (Girard, 1856) (Texas shiner) 
 Notropis amecae Chernoff & R. R. Miller, 1986 (Ameca shiner)
 Notropis ammophilus Suttkus & Boschung, 1990 (Orangefin shiner)
 Notropis amoenus (C. C. Abbott, 1874) (Comely shiner)
 Notropis anogenus S. A. Forbes, 1885 (Pugnose shiner)
 Notropis ariommus (Cope, 1867) (Popeye shiner)
 Notropis asperifrons Suttkus & Raney, 1955 (Burrhead shiner)
 Notropis atherinoides Rafinesque, 1818 (Emerald shiner)
 Notropis atrocaudalis Evermann, 1892 (Blackspot shiner)
 †Notropis aulidion Chernoff & R. R. Miller, 1986 (Durango shiner)
 Notropis baileyi Suttkus & Raney, 1955 (Rough shiner)
 Notropis bairdi C. L. Hubbs & Ortenburger, 1929 (Red River shiner)
 Notropis bifrenatus (Cope, 1867) (Bridle shiner)
 Notropis blennius (Girard, 1856) (River shiner)
 Notropis boops C. H. Gilbert, 1884 (Bigeye shiner)
 Notropis boucardi (Günther, 1868) (Balsas shiner)
 Notropis braytoni D. S. Jordan & Evermann, 1896 (Tamaulipas shiner)
 Notropis buccula F. B. Cross, 1953 (Smalleye shiner)
 Notropis buchanani Meek, 1896 (Ghost shiner)
 Notropis cahabae Mayden & Kuhajda, 1989 (Cahaba shiner)
 Notropis calabazas J. Lyons & Mercado-Silva, 2004 (Calabazas shiner)
 Notropis calientis D. S. Jordan & Snyder, 1899 (Yellow shiner)
 Notropis candidus Suttkus, 1980 (Silverside shiner)
 Notropis chalybaeus (Cope, 1867) (Ironcolor shiner)
 Notropis chihuahua Woolman, 1892 (Chihuahua shiner)
 Notropis chiliticus (Cope, 1870) (Redlip shiner)
 Notropis chlorocephalus (Cope, 1870) (Greenhead shiner)
 Notropis chrosomus (D. S. Jordan, 1877) (Rainbow shiner)
 Notropis cumingii (Günther, 1868) (Atoyac chub)
 Notropis cummingsae G. S. Myers, 1925 (Dusky shiner)
 Notropis dorsalis (Agassiz, 1854) (Bigmouth shiner) 
 Notropis edwardraneyi Suttkus & Clemmer, 1968 (Fluvial shiner)
 Notropis girardi C. L. Hubbs & Ortenburger, 1929 (Arkansas River shiner)
 Notropis grandis Domínguez-Domínguez, Pérez-Rodríguez, Escalera-Vázquez & Doadrio, 2009 (Zacapu shiner)
 Notropis greenei C. L. Hubbs & Ortenburger, 1929 (Wedgespot shiner)
 Notropis harperi (Fowler, 1941), (Redeye chub) 
 Notropis heterodon (Cope, 1865) (Blackchin shiner)
 Notropis heterolepis C. H. Eigenmann & R. S. Eigenmann, 1893 (Blacknose shiner)
 Notropis hudsonius (Clinton, 1824) (Spottail shiner)
 Notropis hypsilepis Suttkus & Raney, 1955 (Highscale shiner)
 Notropis jemezanus (Cope, 1875) (Rio Grande shiner)
 Notropis leuciodus (Cope, 1868) (Tennessee shiner)
 Notropis longirostris (O. P. Hay, 1881) (Longnose shiner)
 Notropis lutipinnis (D. S. Jordan & Brayton, 1878) (Yellowfin shiner)
 Notropis maculatus (O. P. Hay, 1881) (Taillight shiner)
 Notropis marhabatiensis Domínguez-Domínguez, Pérez-Rodríguez, Escalera-Vázquez & Doadrio, 2009 (Maravatío shiner)
 Notropis megalops (Girard, 1856) 
 Notropis mekistocholas Snelson, 1971 (Cape Fear shiner)
 Notropis melanostomus Bortone, 1989 (Blackmouth shiner)
 Notropis micropteryx (Cope, 1868) (Highland shiner)
 Notropis moralesi F. de Buen, 1955 (Papaloapan chub)
 Notropis nazas Meek, 1904 (Nazas shiner)
 Notropis nubilus (S. A. Forbes, 1878) (Ozark minnow)
 †Notropis orca Woolman, 1894 (Phantom shiner)
 Notropis ortenburgeri C. L. Hubbs, 1927 (Kiamichi shiner)
 Notropis oxyrhynchus C. L. Hubbs & Bonham, 1951 (Sharpnose shiner)
 Notropis ozarcanus Meek, 1891 (Ozark shiner)
 Notropis percobromus (Cope, 1871) (Carmine shiner)
 Notropis perpallidus C. L. Hubbs & J. D. Black, 1940 (Peppered shiner)
 Notropis petersoni Fowler, 1942 (Coastal shiner)
 Notropis photogenis (Cope, 1865) (Silver shiner)
 Notropis potteri C. L. Hubbs & Bonham, 1951 (Chub shiner)
 Notropis procne (Cope, 1865) (Swallowtail shiner)
 Notropis rafinesquei Suttkus, 1991 (Yazoo shiner)
 Notropis rubellus (Agassiz, 1850) (Rosyface shiner)
 Notropis rubricroceus (Cope, 1868) (Saffron shiner)
 Notropis rupestris Page, 1987 (Bedrock shiner)
 Notropis sabinae D. S. Jordan & C. H. Gilbert, 1886 (Sabine shiner)
 †Notropis saladonis C. L. Hubbs & C. Hubbs, 1958 (Salado shiner)
 Notropis scabriceps (Cope, 1868) (New River shiner)
 Notropis scepticus (D. S. Jordan & C. H. Gilbert, 1883) (Sandbar shiner)
 Notropis semperasper C. R. Gilbert, 1961 (Roughhead shiner)
 Notropis shumardi (Girard, 1856) (Silverband shiner)
 Notropis simus (Cope, 1875) (Bluntnose shiner)
 Notropis spectrunculus (Cope, 1868) (Mirror shiner)
 Notropis stilbius D. S. Jordan, 1877 (Silverstripe shiner)
 Notropis stramineus (Cope, 1865) (Sand shiner)
 Notropis suttkusi Humphries & Cashner, 1994 (Rocky shiner)
 Notropis telescopus (Cope, 1868) (Telescope shiner)
 Notropis texanus (Girard, 1856) (Weed shiner)
 Notropis topeka (C. H. Gilbert, 1884) (Topeka shiner)
 Notropis tropicus C. L. Hubbs & R. R. Miller, 1975 (Pygmy shiner)
 Notropis uranoscopus Suttkus, 1959 (Skygazer shiner)
 Notropis volucellus (Cope, 1865) (Mimic shiner)
 Notropis wickliffi Trautman, 1931 (Channel shiner)
 Notropis xaenocephalus (D. S. Jordan, 1877) (Coosa shiner)

References

 
Leuciscinae
Cypriniformes genera
Taxa named by Constantine Samuel Rafinesque